Truck Company F, at 1336-1338 Park Rd. NW in Washington, D.C., was built in 1900.  It was listed on the National Register of Historic Places in 2007.  The listing included two contributing buildings.

It was designed by architect Leon E. Dessez in Renaissance style.

It has also been known as Truck Company 6, as Old Engine Company 11, and as Old Columbia Heights Firehouse.

It was designated a Washington, D.C. historic designation on July 22, 2004.  According to the DC Office of Planning,Truck Company F was built in 1900 to serve the emerging neighborhood of Columbia Heights. It was one of the first of a new series of high-style firehouses created in the eclectic period between the late 1890s and World War I, as an expression of civic pride and as a testament to the importance of the Fire Department. The superb Italian Renaissance Revival design by local architect Leon Dessez is executed with a high degree of finish and formality, using Roman brick and glazed terra cotta detail. The rear stable, similar in design, also remains. The firehouse was built for Truck Company F (whose designation is inscribed in the terra cotta frieze); it was renamed Truck Company 6 in 1906, and merged with Engine Company 11 in 1940. The building was removed from active duty when Engine Company 11 relocated in 1982.

References

Fire stations on the National Register of Historic Places in Washington, D.C.
Renaissance Revival architecture in Washington, D.C.
Fire stations completed in 1900
1900 establishments in Washington, D.C.